ITXC Corporation (Internet Telephony Exchange Carrier) was a US-based wholesale provider of Voice over IP (VoiP), Internet-based phone calls.

It was co-founded by Tom Evslin and his wife Mary in 1997 with seed money from AT&T and VocalTec. In 2000, it had the largest Internet telephony network in the world. The company was acquired by Teleglobe Bermuda Ltd. in 2004.

Technology
The technology to power ITXC's voice over IP network was initially provided by Israeli company VocalTec, who also owned 20% of the company but later sold its stake. In 2003 the company moved to exclusively use Cisco's equipment.

References

External links
 ITXC at Telephony.com.
 Cognos Sales Wins: Dealtime, ITXC & The Credit Store Leverage the Combined Power of Cognos and Microsoft.
 IP Interoperability: ITXC bids to become the Internet's first carrier's carrier.

Telecommunications companies of the United States
Telecommunications companies of Israel
Companies formerly listed on the Nasdaq